Pseudooceanicola batsensis is a Gram-negative, rod-shaped, chemoheterotrophic and non-motile bacterium from the genus of Pseudooceanicola which has been isolated from seawater from the Sargasso Sea.

References 

Rhodobacteraceae
Bacteria described in 2004